Zig is an imperative, general-purpose, statically typed, compiled system programming language designed by Andrew Kelley. It is intended to be a natural replacement for the C programming language, with the goals of being even smaller and simpler to program in while also offering modern features, new optimizations and a variety of safety mechanisms while not as demanding of runtime safety as seen in other languages. It is distinct from languages like Rust or Carbon, which have similar goals but are much more complex languages best described as replacements for C++ as opposed to C.

Among the many small changes that intend to improve simplicity, flow control, function calls and memory allocations are always exposed, there are no macros or preprocessor instructions, library imports are handled using ants, declarations are position-independent so there is no need for forward declarations, and visibility is defined in the code so there is no need to manually create a header file. Zig also directly supports Unicode.

Zig also includes a number of features from newer languages. Among these is the addition of compile-time generic types, allowing functions to work on a variety of data, along with a small set of new compiler directives to allow access to the information about those types using reflection. This includes the  directive, which ensures types are fully "known" at compile time using duck typing, eliminating the need for runtime checks.

Another set of additions to Zig is intended to improve code safety. Like C, Zig does not include garbage collection and memory handling is manual. To help eliminate the potential errors that arise in such systems, it includes option types and simple syntax for using them. It also includes a complete testing framework that makes it easy to build tests into the source.

Description

Goals
The primary goal of Zig is to "be pragmatic", in that it is intended to be a better solution to the sorts of tasks that are currently solved with C. A primary concern in that respect is readability; Zig attempts to use existing concepts and syntax wherever possible, avoiding the addition of different syntax for similar concepts. Additionally, it is designed for "robustness, optimality and maintainability", including a variety of features to improve safety, optimization and testing. The small and simple syntax is an important part of the maintenance, as it is a goal of the language to allow maintainers to debug the code without having to learn the intricacies of a language they might not be familiar with. Even with these changes, Zig can compile into and against existing C code; C headers can be included in a Zig project and their functions called, and Zig code can be linked into C projects by including the compiler-built headers.

In keeping with the overall design philosophy of making the code simple and easy to read, the Zig system as a whole also encompasses a number of stylistic changes compared to C and other C-like languages. For instance, in the Rust has operator overloading which means a simple call like  might actually be a function call to a type's overloaded version of the plus sign. Additionally, that function might raise an exception which might pre-empt any following code. In Zig, if something calls a function it looks like a function call, if it doesn't it doesn't look like a function, and if something raises an error it is explicit in the syntax.

The goals of Zig are in contrast to the many similar languages introduced in the 2020s time-frame, like Go, Rust, Carbon, Nim and many others. Generally, these languages are more complex with additional features like operator overloading, functions that masquerade as values (properties), generic types and many other features intended to aid the construction of large programs. These sorts of features have more in common with C++'s approach, and these languages are more along the lines of that language.

Memory handling
One of the primary sources of bugs in C programs is the memory management system, based on malloc. malloc sets aside a block of memory for use in the code and returns a reference to that memory as a pointer. There is no system to ensure that memory is released when the program no longer needs it, which can lead to programs using up all available memory, a memory leak. More common, and sometimes called the worst mistake in computer programming, is the null pointer error, when the memory pointed to no longer exists because the malloc failed, the memory was released by other code, or a host of other problems.

A common solution to these problems is a garbage collector (GC), which examines the program for pointers to previously malloced memory, and removing any blocks that no longer have anything pointing to them. Although this greatly reduces, or even eliminates, memory errors, GC systems are relatively slow compared to manual memory management, and have unpredictable performance that makes them unsuited to systems programming. Another solution is automatic reference counting (ARC), which implements the same basic concept of looking for pointers to removed memory, but does so at malloc time by recording the number of pointers to that block, meaning there does not need to perform an exhaustive search, but instead adds time to every malloc and release operation.

Zig aims to provide performance similar or better than C, so GC and ARC are not suitable solutions. Instead, it uses a modern, concept known as optional types, or smart pointers. Instead of a pointer being allowed to point to nothing, or nil, a separate type is used to indicate data that is optionally empty. This is similar to using a structure with a pointer and a boolean that indicates whether the pointer is valid, but the state of the boolean is invisibly managed by the language and does not need to be explicitly managed by the programmer. So, for instance, when the pointer is declared it is set to "unallocated", and when that pointer receives a value from a malloc, it is set to "allocated" if the malloc succeeded.

The advantage to this model is that it has very low or zero overhead; the compiler has to create the code to pass along the optional type when pointers are manipulated, as opposed to a simple pointer, but this allows it to directly express possible memory problems at compile time with no runtime support. For instance, creating a pointer with a null value and then attempting to use it is perfectly acceptable in C, leading to null-pointer errors. In contrast, a language using optional types can check that all code paths only attempt to use pointers when they are valid. While this does not eliminate all potential problems, when issues do occur at runtime the error can be more precisely located and explained.

Another change for memory management in Zig is that the actual allocation is handled through s describing the action, as opposed to calling the memory management functions in libc. For instance, in C if one wants to write a function that makes a string containing multiple copies of another string, the function might look like this:

 const char* repeat(const char* original, size_t times);

That malloc is invisible to the functions calling it, if they fail to later release the memory, a leak will occur. In Zig, this might be handled using a function like:

 fn repeat(allocator: *std.mem.Allocator, original: []const u8, times: usize) std.mem.Allocator.Error![]const u8;

By directly expressing the allocator as an input, memory allocation is never "hidden" within another function, it is always exposed to the API by the function that is ultimately calling for the memory to be allocated. No allocations are performed inside Zig's standard library. Additionally, as the struct can point to anything, one can use alternative allocators, even ones written in the program. This can allow, for instance, small-object allocators that do not use the operating system functions that normally allocate an entire memory page.

Optional types are an example of a language feature that offers general functionality while still being simple and generic. They do not have to be used to solve null pointer problems, they are also useful for any type of value where "no value" is an appropriate answer. Consider a function  that returns an integer, and an integer variable,  that holds the result.

Zig memory management avoids hidden allocations. Allocation is not managed in the language directly. Instead, heap access is done in a standard library, explicitly.

Direct interaction with C
Zig promotes an evolutionary approach to using the language that combines new Zig code with existing C code. To do this, it aims to make interaction with existing C libraries as seamless as possible. Zig imports its own libraries with the  directive, typically in this fashion:

 const std = @import("std");

Zig code within that file can now call functions inside std, for instance:

 std.debug.print("Hello, world!\n", .{});

 const c = @cImport(@cInclude("soundio/soundio.h"));

The Zig code can now call functions in the soundio library as if they were native Zig code.

Cross compiling
Zig treats cross-compiling as a first-class use-case of the language. This means any Zig compiler can compile runnable binaries for any of its target platforms, of which there are dozens. These include not only widely-used modern systems like ARM and x86-64, but also PowerPC, SPARC, MIPS, RISC-V and even IBM zSystems (S390). The toolchain can compile to any of these targets without installing additional software, all the needed support is in the basic system.

Other features
Zig supports compile time generics, reflection and evaluation, cross-compiling, and manual memory management. A major goal of the language is to improve on the C language, while also taking inspiration from Rust, among others. Zig has many features for low-level programming, notably packed structs (structs without padding between fields), arbitrary-width integers and multiple pointer types.

Zig is not just a new language: it also includes a C/C++ compiler, and can be used with either or both languages.

Versions
Since version 0.10 the (new default) Zig compiler is written in Zig, i.e., it is a self-hosting compiler, and that is a major new feature of that release (the older legacy bootstrapping compiler, written in C++, is still an option but will not be in 0.11). The default backend (i.e. the optimizer) is still LLVM (now version 15, legacy uses version 13), and LLVM is written in C++. Zig (i.e. the compiler, not generated code from it) with LLVM is 169 MiB, vs without LLVM 4.4 MiB. When compiling with the new Zig compiler much less memory is used (the older, now legacy, compiler uses 3.5x more memory), and it compiles a bit faster. Faster executable code is usually compiled with the new compiler (i.e. its LLVM code generation is better), and it fixes many bugs, but there are also improvements for the older legacy compiler in version 0.10. The self-hosted linker is tightly coupled with the self-hosted compiler. The new version also adds some experimental (tier-3) support for AMD GPUs (there's also some lesser support for Nvidia GPUs and for PlayStation 4 and 5).

The older bootstrapping ("stage1") compiler is written in Zig and C++, using LLVM 13 as a back-end, supporting many of its native targets. The compiler is free and open-source software released under an MIT License. The Zig compiler exposes the ability to compile C and C++ similarly to Clang with the commands zig cc and zig c++, providing many headers including the C standard library (libc) and C++ Standard Library (libcxx) for many different platforms, allowing Zig's cc and c++ sub-commands to act as cross compilers out of the box.

Plus the operating systems (mostly desktop ones) officially supported (and documented), (minimal) applications can and have been made for Android (with Android NDK, and programming for iOS also possible).

Zig doesn't have its own official package manager (non-official ones exist), but a standard one has a milestone for 0.12.

Zig development is funded by the Zig Software Foundation (ZSF), a non-profit corporation with Andrew Kelley as president, which accepts donations and hires multiple full-time employees.

Examples

Hello World
const std = @import("std");

pub fn main() !void {
    const stdout = std.io.getStdOut().writer();
    try stdout.print("Hello, {s}!\n", .{"world"});
}

Generic linked list 
pub fn main() void {
    var node = LinkedList(i32).Node {
        .prev = null,
        .next = null,
        .data = 1234,
    };

    var list = LinkedList(i32) {
        .first = &node,
        .last = &node,
        .len = 1,
    };
}

fn LinkedList(comptime T: type) type {
    return struct {
        pub const Node = struct {
            prev: ?*Node,
            next: ?*Node,
            data: T,
        };

        first: ?*Node,
        last:  ?*Node,
        len:   usize,
    };
}

Projects 
 Bun is a JavaScript and TypeScript runtime written in Zig, using Safari's JavaScriptCore virtual machine.

See also

C
C++
Nim
Rust
D
Carbon

References

Citations

Bibliography

External links 

Movie: Introducing Zig
Movie: The Road to 1.0
Zig Weekly

Programming languages
Cross-platform free software
Cross-platform software
Embedded systems
Free compilers and interpreters
Free computer libraries
Programming languages created in 2015
Statically typed programming languages
Software using the MIT license
Systems programming languages
C (programming language) compilers